Pekin is an unincorporated community in Clearcreek Township, Warren County, Ohio, United States, at the intersection of State Route 48 and Pekin Road. Pekin is approximately 3 miles south of Springboro and 7 miles northwest of Lebanon.

A post office called Pekin was established in 1874, and remained in operation until 1901.

References

Unincorporated communities in Warren County, Ohio
Unincorporated communities in Ohio